Lai Nair (literally "Black Lake") is a small lake above Tarasp in the Lower Engadine, Graubünden, Switzerland.

The site is listed in the Inventory of Raised and Transitional Bogs of National Importance.

Nair
Nair
Protected areas of Switzerland
Engadin